Midway is an unincorporated community in southern Santa Rosa County, Florida, United States. It is part of the Pensacola–Ferry Pass–Brent Metropolitan Statistical Area. The area is located between the communities of Gulf Breeze and Navarre, on the Fairpoint Peninsula. Midway is often considered to be part of one, if not both, of these communities. Its actual boundaries vary from source to source, but unofficially include most areas from the intersection of Soundside Drive with U.S. Highway 98, eastward until Highway 98 becomes Navarre Parkway.

Midway Water Systems, Inc., which provides water service to the communities of Gulf Breeze and Navarre, is located in Midway. The community also has a fire department, the Midway Fire Department. Midway is also home to VFW "Bruce J Bell Memorial" Post 4407 which is often referred to as the 'Friendliest Little Post in Florida". 

Per the 2020 Census, the population was 19,567.

Demographics

2020 census

Note: the US Census treats Hispanic/Latino as an ethnic category. This table excludes Latinos from the racial categories and assigns them to a separate category. Hispanics/Latinos can be of any race.

References

External links
 Santa Rosa Medical Center Hospital and Emergency Room located in Milton, Florida. The primary provider of hospital based healthcare services in Santa Rosa County.

Unincorporated communities in Santa Rosa County, Florida
Pensacola metropolitan area
Unincorporated communities in Florida
Populated places on the Intracoastal Waterway in Florida
Census-designated places in Florida

Navarre, Florida